Jumpingpound Mountain (elevation ) is a mountain located  west of Bragg Creek, Alberta in Kananaskis Country. It was named after Jumpingpound Creek in 1949 because a steep bank near the mouth was used as a buffalo jump by the Blackfoot First Nations.

References

Two-thousanders of Alberta
Buffalo jumps
Alberta's Rockies